Bukit Putus Viaduct is the fourth highest bridge in Malaysia. The 48 metre tall bridge is located at Federal Route  near Bukit Putus, Negeri Sembilan. It was opened in November 2009.

Bridges in Negeri Sembilan
Bridges completed in 2009
Box girder bridges